Sir Frederick William Adolphus Wright-Bruce, GCB (14 April 1814 – 19 September 1867) was a British diplomat.

Early life
Frederick Bruce was the youngest of the three sons of Thomas Bruce, 7th Earl of Elgin and his second wife Elizabeth, youngest daughter of James Townshend Oswald of Dunnikier, Fife. He was born at Broomhall, Fife, on 14 April 1814.  It was during his brief practice as a barrister that he changed his surname after receiving a large inheritance from a client.

Diplomatic service
On 9 February 1842 he was attached to Lord Ashburton's mission to Washington, returning to England with his lordship in September of that year.

Hong Kong, Bolivia, Uruguay, Egypt and China
On 9 February 1844 he was appointed colonial secretary at Hong Kong, and accompanied its second governor John Francis Davis on  arriving there on 8 May of that year.  He left Hong Kong to begin 16 months' leave, on the 23 June 1846, and just four days later was appointed lieutenant-governor of Newfoundland.

His next change was to Sucre, with the appointment of consul-general in the republic of Bolivia on 23 July 1847, and on 14 April 1848 he was accredited as chargé d'affaires. He was named chargé d'affaires to the Oriental republic of Uruguay on 29 August 1851, and on 3 August 1853 became agent and consul-general in Egypt in the place of the Hon. C. A. Murray.

On his brother, Lord Elgin, being appointed ambassador extraordinary to China, he accompanied him as principal secretary in April 1857. He brought home (18 September 1857) the treaty with China signed at Tientsin on 26 June 1858 and was made a C.B. on 28 September.

His diplomatic tact was thoroughly appreciated by the home government, for he was appointed on 2 December 1858 envoy extraordinary and minister plenipotentiary to the Xianfeng Emperor of China, and on 1 March following chief superintendent of British trade in that country. His mission was prevented from proceeding to Peking by the opposition made by the Chinese. The mission therefore returned to Shanghai, where it remained until the ratification of the treaty of 26 June 1858 at Peking on 24 October 1860. He proceeded to Peking on 7 November 1860 but withdrew to Tientsin for the winter, while arrangements were made for putting a residence in order for his reception. The mission was established at Peking on 26 March 1861, but it was not until 2 April that Bruce paid a visit to Prince Gong. During his time in Shanghai, his support for the Qing contributed heavily to Britain's later intervention in the Taiping Rebellion.

United States
On the removal of Lord Lyons from Washington to Constantinople, Bruce was selected to fill the important office of British representative at Washington on 1 March 1865. He was made a K.C.B. of the civil division on 12 December 1862 and received the grand cross of the order on 17 March 1865. He was appointed umpire by the commission named under the convention of 1864, concluded between the United States of America and the United States of Colombia, for the adjustment of claims of American citizens against the Colombian government.

He died, unmarried, at Boston in the United States on 19 September 1867, when his remains were embalmed and, being conveyed to Scotland, were interred at Dunfermline Abbey on 8 October.

Notes

References

Attribution

1814 births
1867 deaths
Ambassadors of the United Kingdom to China
Ambassadors of the United Kingdom to the United States
British consuls-general in Egypt
Chief Secretaries of Hong Kong
Knights Grand Cross of the Order of the Bath
Lieutenant Governors of Newfoundland and Labrador
People from Fife
Ambassadors of the United Kingdom to Uruguay
Ambassadors of the United Kingdom to Bolivia
Younger sons of earls
Frederick